Rome Trumain Flynn (born November 25, 1991) is an American actor, model and musician. He is best known for his portrayal of Zende Forrester Dominguez on the CBS daytime drama The Bold and the Beautiful for which he won the Daytime Emmy Award for Outstanding Younger Actor in a Drama Series in 2018. His other notable roles include his portrayal of law student Gabriel Maddox in the ABC drama How to Get Away with Murder.

Career
Flynn managed to get himself on the radar of casting directors by building up his social media following. In the spring of 2014, Flynn was cast in the television movie Drumline: A New Beat, the sequel to the 2002 film Drumline. Flynn was on set filming when his daughter was born.

In May 2015, Flynn joined the cast of The Bold and the Beautiful in the role of Zende. In November 2016, Flynn announced that he had been cast in the film adaptation of Gretchen McNeil's novel TEN opposite China Anne McClain.

In 2017, Flynn guest starred in episodes of the CBS crime dramas NCIS: New Orleans and MacGyver. Flynn later joined the cast of OWN's The Haves and the Have Nots.  On August 17, 2017, Flynn announced on social media that he had chosen to leave The Bold and the Beautiful after two years with the series.

In 2018, after appearing in the fourth season finale of How to Get Away with Murder as Gabriel Maddox, Flynn was upped to a series regular for the fourth season.

On February 23, 2021, it was announced that Flynn had been cast as Tevin Wakefield in the second season of the Netflix series Raising Dion, executive produced by Michael B. Jordan. Later that day, it was also announced that Flynn had booked a recurring role of in the fourth and final season of Justin Simien's Dear White People, also distributed by Netflix. Flynn joined the cast of Gloria Calderón Kellett With Love, produced by Amazon Studios.

Personal life
Flynn has a daughter Kimiko (born December 12, 2014). In 2015, Kimiko appeared with Flynn in a Christmas themed photo shoot for CBS Soaps In Depth.

Filmography

Film

Television

Discography

Singles

Awards and nominations

References

External links

1991 births
Living people
People from Chicago
Male models from Illinois
American male soap opera actors
American male television actors
21st-century American male actors
African-American male actors
American people of Cuban descent
American people of Irish descent
Daytime Emmy Award winners
Daytime Emmy Award for Outstanding Younger Actor in a Drama Series winners
21st-century African-American people